Andrea Filser (born 25 March 1993) is a German World Cup alpine ski racer.

Filser represented Germany at the World Championships in 2021, where she won bronze medal in the team event.

World Cup results

Season standings

Top twenty results

 0 podiums; 4 top twenties

World Championship results

References

External links

1993 births
Living people
German female alpine skiers
21st-century German women